Mbout  is a town and commune in Mauritania. Located in the Gorgol Region, it is the birthplace of Moussa Diagana.

Communes of Mauritania
Gorgol Region